A referendum on one of the country's opt-outs from the European Union was held in Denmark on 3 December 2015. Specifically, the referendum was on whether to convert Denmark's current full opt-out on home and justice matters into an opt-out with case-by-case opt-in similar to those held by Ireland and the United Kingdom. Approval of the referendum was needed for Denmark to remain in Europol under the new rules. However, it was rejected by 53% of voters.

Background

After Danish voters rejected the Maastricht Treaty in a 1992 referendum, the Edinburgh Agreement that was reached granted four exceptions to Denmark, one of which concerning Justice and Home Affairs. The Danish people subsequently approved the Maastricht Treaty in a 1993 referendum.

Several Danish governments had considered holding a referendum on abolishing certain opt-outs. When it became clear that, under new rules, Denmark would have to leave Europol due to its full opt-out, the two main political parties agreed to hold a referendum after the 2015 general election. The second Lars Løkke Rasmussen government that was formed following the election subsequently decided on 21 August 2015 to hold a referendum on 3 December.

Consequences in legislation

List of legislation
The following are EU-laws affected by the opt-outs, that the proponents wanted to opt into:

Police and criminal law
 Directive 2014/41/EU, EUR-lex, eu.dk , Direktivet om den europæiske efterforskningskendelse i straffesager, regarding the European Investigation Order in criminal matters
 Directive 2011/99/EU (de), EUR-lex, eu.dk , Direktivet om den europæiske beskyttelsesordre, regarding the European protection order
 Regulation 606/2013 (de), EUR-lex, eu.dk , Forordningen om den civilretlige beskyttelsesordre, regarding the European protection order
 Directive 2011/36/EU (de), EUR-lex, eu.dk , Menneskehandelsdirektivet, regarding preventing and combating trafficking in human beings and protecting its victims
 Directive 2011/92/EU, EUR-lex, eu.dk , Direktivet om seksuelt misbrug af børn, regarding combating the sexual abuse and sexual exploitation of children and child pornography
 Directive 2013/40/EU, EUR-lex, eu.dk , Cybercrimedirektivet, regarding attacks against information systems
 Directive 2014/57/EU, EUR-lex, eu.dk , Direktivet om markedsmisbrug, regarding criminal sanctions for market abuse
 Directive 2014/62/EU, EUR-lex, eu.dk , Direktivet om falskmøntneri, regarding the protection of the euro and other currencies against counterfeiting by criminal law

Civil law and commercial law
 Regulation 1346/2000 (de), EUR-lex, eu.dk , Konkursforordningen, regarding insolvency proceedings
 Regulation 1206/2001, EUR-lex, eu.dk , Bevisoptagelsesforordningen, regarding cooperation between the courts of the Member States in the taking of evidence in civil or commercial matters
 Regulation 1896/2006, EUR-lex, eu.dk , Betalingspåkravsforordningen, creating a European order for payment procedure
 Regulation 861/2007, EUR-lex, eu.dk , Småkravsforordningen, establishing a European Small Claims Procedure
 Regulation 805/2004, EUR-lex, eu.dk , Forordningen om indførelse af et europæisk tvangsfuldbyrdelsesdokument for ubestridte krav, creating a European Enforcement Order for uncontested claims
 Directive 2008/52/EC (de), EUR-lex, eu.dk , Mæglingsdirektivet, regarding mediation in civil and commercial matters
 Regulation 593/2008, EUR-lex, eu.dk , 
 Regulation 864/2007, EUR-lex, eu.dk , 
 Regulation 662/2009, EUR-lex, eu.dk , Forordningen om bilaterale aftaler om lovvalgsregler, establishing a procedure for the negotiation and conclusion of agreements between Member States and third countries on particular matters concerning the law applicable to contractual and non-contractual obligations 
 Regulation 655/2014, EUR-lex, eu.dk , Kontosikringsforordningen, establishing a European Account Preservation Order procedure to facilitate cross-border debt recovery in civil and commercial matters

Family law
 Regulation 650/2012 (de), EUR-lex, eu.dk , Arveretsforordningen, regarding jurisdiction, applicable law, recognition and enforcement of decisions and acceptance and enforcement of authentic instruments in matters of succession and on the creation of a European Certificate of Succession
 Regulation 2201/2003, EUR-lex, eu.dk , Bruxelles IIa-forordningen, regarding jurisdiction and the recognition and enforcement of judgments in matrimonial matters and the matters of parental responsibility
 Regulation 4/2009, EUR-lex, eu.dk , Underholdspligtsforordningen, regarding jurisdiction, applicable law, recognition and enforcement of decisions and cooperation in matters relating to maintenance obligations
 Regulation 664/2009, EUR-lex, eu.dk , Forordningen om bilaterale familieretlige aftaler, establishing a procedure for the negotiation and conclusion of agreements between Member States and third countries concerning jurisdiction, recognition and enforcement of judgments and decisions in matrimonial matters, matters of parental responsibility and matters relating to maintenance obligations, and the law applicable to matters relating to maintenance obligations

Proposals
 Europol, eu.dk 
 PNR, eu.dk 
 Eurojust, eu.dk

Campaign

A "yes" vote was supported by the governing Venstre, the Social Democrats, the Conservative People's Party, The Alternative, the Social Liberal Party and the Socialist People's Party. A "no" vote was supported by the Danish People's Party, the Liberal Alliance, the Red–Green Alliance, the People's Movement against the EU and the Young Conservatives.

Opinion polls

Results

Footnotes

References

2015 referendums
2015 in Denmark
2015
Referendums related to the European Union
Denmark and the European Union
December 2015 events in Europe
2015 in the European Union